The  were a class of six destroyers of the Imperial Japanese Navy. As with the previous , all were named after trees.

Background
With most of Japan’s destroyers deployed to the Mediterranean Sea as part of Japan’s contribution to the war effort against Imperial Germany under the Anglo-Japanese Alliance, the Imperial Japanese Navy approached the Diet of Japan for an emergency procurement budget, similar to that awarded during the Russo-Japanese War for the production of the  destroyers. The funding was awarded from the fiscal 1917 budget, but mindful of the fact that the Kamikaze-class destroyers had not actually been completed until after the end of the previous war, the government stipulated that the emergency budget be used up within a six-month period.

The order for six vessels was split between the four major naval shipyards: one to Yokosuka Naval Arsenal, two to Kure Naval Arsenal, two to Sasebo Naval Arsenal and one to Maizuru Naval Arsenal.

Design
With such a limited time frame to use its budget, the Japanese Navy could not afford the time to design a new ship. Therefore, the blueprints for the previous Momo-class destroyers were distributed to each shipyard, with the instructions that identical ships be produced, except with sturdier armor and bow construction. Experience with extended overseas deployment in World War I had taught the Japanese Navy that the construction of its destroyers needed to be reinforced to handle heavy seas. The result was a ship which looked physically almost exactly like the Momo class, but was roughly 15 tons heavier in displacement.

Internally, all six vessels used Brown-Curtis geared steam turbine engines, which could use either heavy fuel oil or coal for propulsion. Armament was identical to the Momo class, with three QF 4.7 inch Gun Mk I – IV guns, pedestal mounted along the centerline of the vessel, front, mid-ship and to the stern and two triple torpedo launchers.

Operational history
The Enoki-class destroyers served in the very final stages of World War I, where they were deployed mostly in local waters near the Japanese home islands. Enoki and Nara were converted to minesweepers on 1 June 1930. The remaining four vessels were retired on 1 April 1934.

List of Ships

Notes

References

Destroyer classes